Teucrium aroanium is a species of flowering plant in the family Lamiaceae. It is endemic to Greece.

References

Sources

 Diagn. Pl. Orient. II, 4: 55 1859.
 The Plant List entry
 Catalogue of Life entry

aroanium
Taxa named by Theodoros G. Orphanides
Taxa named by Pierre Edmond Boissier
Flora of Greece